David Paul Leiper (born June 18, 1962) is an American former professional baseball pitcher. He played in Major League Baseball (MLB) for the Oakland Athletics (1984, 1986–87 and 1994–95), San Diego Padres (1987–89), Montreal Expos (1995 and 1996), and Philadelphia Phillies (1996).

In 8 seasons he had a win–loss record of 12–8 in 264 games, 65 games finished, 7 saves, 278 innings pitched, 282 hits allowed, 141 runs allowed, 123 earned runs allowed, 25 home runs allowed, 114 walks, 150 strikeouts, 12 wild pitches, 17 intentional walks, 3 balks, 3.98 ERA and a WHIP of 1.424.

References

External links
, or Retrosheet, or Pelota Binaria (Venezuelan Winter League)

1962 births
Living people
American expatriate baseball players in Canada
Baseball players from California
Cardenales de Lara players
American expatriate baseball players in Venezuela
Carolina Mudcats players
Edmonton Trappers players
Fullerton Hornets baseball players
Gulf Coast Pirates players
Idaho Falls A's players
Las Vegas Stars (baseball) players
Madison Muskies players
Major League Baseball pitchers
Modesto A's players
Montreal Expos players
Oakland Athletics players
Ottawa Lynx players
Philadelphia Phillies players
San Diego Padres players
Sportspeople from Whittier, California
Tacoma Tigers players